Desert senna is a common name for several plants and may refer to:

Senna armata
Senna covesii